The 1995 Lafayette Leopards football team was an American football team that represented Lafayette College during the 1995 NCAA Division I-AA football season. Lafayette finished third in the Patriot League.

In their 15th year under head coach Bill Russo, the Leopards compiled a 4–6–1 record. Glenn Hunzinger, Gavin Morrissey and Jarrett Shine were the team captains.

The Leopards were outscored 250 to 176. Lafayette's 3–2 conference record placed third in the six-team Patriot League standings.

Lafayette played its home games at Fisher Field on College Hill in Easton, Pennsylvania.

Schedule

References

Lafayette
Lafayette Leopards football seasons
Lafayette Leopards football